Barry Paw was a Burmese American biologist. He was notable for his role in discovering a new gene in humans that contributes to the production of hemoglobin.

Paw worked in the United States as a researcher at Harvard Medical School and had undertaken research into how the gene mitoferrin transports iron to red blood cells to form hemoglobin. Hemoglobin carries oxygen from the lungs to the rest of the body, including the muscles.

Paw's research was targeted to reveal changes in the gene that cause human diseases, including iron deficiency or that cause an excessive amount of iron.

Dr. Paw died unexpectedly on December 28, 2017, at the age of 55.

References

1962 births
2017 deaths
Burmese scientists
Burmese biologists
Harvard Medical School staff
American people of Burmese descent
David Geffen School of Medicine at UCLA alumni